Thekidswhopoptodaywillrocktomorrow was the first EP released by Biffy Clyro.

Overview
It was a limited edition release on Stow College's Electric Honey label while the band were studying audio there. Thekidswho..., as it is generally referred to, has gone on to be regarded as a seminal release by the band. Three of the tracks feature in later releases ("57" and "Justboy" as album tracks and singles on Blackened Sky, and "Hope for an Angel" as a B-side on the "57" single), but the versions on this early CD differ from those later versions from the Blackened Sky era.

Track listing
Songs and lyrics by Simon Neil. Music by Biffy Clyro.

Personnel
 Simon Neil – guitar, vocals
 James Johnston – bass, vocals
 Ben Johnston – drums, vocals

References 

Biffy Clyro albums
2000 debut EPs
Electric Honey (label) EPs